It Just Gets Worse is the sixth album by the grindcore band Anal Cunt, released on November 9, 1999, on Earache Records.

Recording information
The album was recorded between August 1998 and August 1999 (except tracks 38 and 39 which were recorded and mixed in August 1997), although the majority of it was recorded after the band's 1998 tour in Japan. The guitar and drums were recorded on a 4-track at Anal Cunt's practice space and the vocals were recorded on a PA in the studio, where vocalist Seth Putnam mixed it. The album was then released after their 1999 European tour with the band Flächenbrand and was the last of the band's albums released under the Earache label which they got dropped from in May 2000. "Your Kid Committed Suicide Because You Suck" was originally titled "Connor Clapton Committed Suicide Because His Father Sucks". "Chris Barnes Is a Pussy" was based on an alleged incident that involved Putnam being attacked by Six Feet Under's roadies, while their vocalist Chris Barnes fled to his tour bus after a scuffle between the two.

Track listing

Personnel
Anal Cunt
Seth Putnam – vocals
Josh Martin – guitar
Nate Linehan – drums, backing vocals (39)

Additional musicians
Choke (Slapshot) – backing vocals (1-3, 5, 7, 8, 9, 13, 16, 18, 19, 21–24, 26–29, 31, 34, 36)
Anal Cunt Gestapo – backing vocals (5, 21, 35, 36)

References

Anal Cunt albums
1999 albums
Earache Records albums